Teachers 2: Back To School is the official soundtrack, on the Channel 4 label, of the second series of British television comedy-drama series Teachers.

This album contains music by various artists, heard in the show itself.

Track listing
 "Hate To Say I Told You So" by The Hives
 "Empty At The End" by The Electric Soft Parade
 "Lucky Charm" by The Apples in Stereo
 "Poor Misguided Fool" by Starsailor
 "Doping For Gold" by Preston School of Industry
 "Eight Track" by Fonda 500
 "Value Of Life" by Cosmic Rough Riders
 "Distant Sunshine" by Kid Galahad
 "We Can't Rewind" by Feeder
 "Kit & Holly" by Echoboy
 "Slack" by Turin Brakes
 "You're My Queen" by Mercury Rev
 "To You" by I Am Kloot
 "Drop & Roll" by Simian
 "Apple Of My Eye" by Ed Harcourt

External links
 Listen to samples at Last.fm
 Teachers: Back To School at Play.com
 Back To School on Amazon

Television soundtracks
2002 soundtrack albums